Per Olov "Olle" Goop (13 August 1943 – 20 April 2022) was a Swedish trotting driver and trainer who specialised in harness racing.

Goop died on 20 April 2022, at the age of 78.

References

External links 

Stall Goop 

1943 births
2022 deaths
Swedish harness racers
People from Mora Municipality
Sportspeople from Dalarna County